3C 219 is a Seyfert galaxy with a quasar-like appearance located in the constellation Ursa Major. This galaxy's radio jets are not detectable between the core and the outer radio lobes.

See also
 Lists of galaxies

References

External links
 www.jb.man.ac.uk/atlas/ (J. P. Leahy)
 3C219 = B0917+458 (Alan Bridle / 23 September 1999)
 Radio structure in radio galaxies (William C. Keel @ University of Alabama)

Radio galaxies
Seyfert galaxies
219
3C 219
2817605
Ursa Major (constellation)